Gerald Westerby, or Jerry Westerby, is a fictional character created by John le Carré, and is the titular figure in The Honourable Schoolboy.

Westerby, former cricketer and sports journalist, is an "Occasional" asset of British intelligence ("the Circus"). Initially recruited by George Smiley, he was recalled from his Italian idyll and despatched to Hong Kong.

Portrayals
Westerby was played by Joss Ackland in the 1979 television serial based on the novel Tinker Tailor Soldier Spy. His role in the 2011 film adaptation was amalgamated with that of Sam Collins, played by Stephen Graham.

Hugh Bonneville played the role of Westerby in the BBC Radio 4 dramatisation of the John le Carré novel The Honourable Schoolboy, first broadcast in January 2010.

References

Fictional British secret agents
John le Carré
Novel series
Characters in British novels of the 20th century
Literary characters introduced in 1973